Now & Forever: The Hits is the first greatest hits album by American girl group TLC. It was released by Arista Records on September 30, 2003, in Japan, on November 24, 2003, in the United Kingdom and on June 21, 2005, in North America.

The album comprises nearly all of their singles (excluding "Hands Up" and "Dear Lie") released between 1991 and 2003. Most of the tracks on the album are radio edits in order to fit all of the songs into one disc. The album contains tracks such as a 2003 production "Come Get Some", which featured Lil Jon and Sean Paul of YoungBloodz, and "Whoop De Woo", a leftover track from the 3D recording sessions. In September 2005, the album was reissued digitally to include "I Bet", the single which featured winner O'so Krispie from TLC's UPN reality television series R U the Girl.

The album debuted to number 53 on the Billboard 200, selling approximately 26,000 copies in its first. It briefly reentered the Billboard 200 at number 169 in November 2013 following the premiere of the group's biopic CrazySexyCool: The TLC Story on VH1.

Track listing

Notes
  signifies a co-producer

Sample credits
 "Ain't 2 Proud 2 Beg" contains samples of "Escapism" by James Brown, "Jungle Boogie" by Kool & the Gang and "School Boy Crush" by Average White Band.
 "Hat 2 da Back" contains samples of "Big Ole Butt" by LL Cool J and "What Makes You Happy" by KC and the Sunshine Band.
 "Creep" contains a sample of "Hey Young World" by Slick Rick.

Personnel
Credits adapted from the liner notes of Now & Forever: The Hits.

Musicians
 Dallas Austin – arrangement 
 Lisa "Left Eye" Lopes – rap 
 Craig Love – guitar

Technical

 Dallas Austin – production 
 Tim & Bob – production 
 L.A. Reid – production ; executive production
 Babyface – production 
 Daryl Simmons – production 
 Organized Noize – production 
 Jermaine Dupri – production, remix 
 Manuel Seal – co-production 
 Cyptron – production 
 Kevin "She'kspere" Briggs – production 
 Jonathan "Lil Jon" Smith – production, mixing 
 Mark "Exit" Goodchild – recording 
 John Frye – recording, mixing 
 Sam Thomas – recording 
 Delicia Hassan – production coordination 
 Eddie Hustle – production 
 The Neptunes – production 
 Rodney Jerkins – production, vocal production 
 TLC – executive production
 Herb Powers Jr. – mastering

Artwork
 Courtney Walter – art direction, design
 Jack Chuck – cover photography
 Dah Len, Seb Janiak, Michael Lavine, Arnold Turner, Sheryl Nields – photography
 Shahid Ali – inside illustration

Charts

Certifications

Now & Forever: The Video Hits

Now & Forever: The Video Hits is a music video compilation containing TLC's music videos from 1992 to 2002. It was released on DVD in Japan in 2003 and in Australia in 2004 by Arista Records with the same track listing, cover and inside booklet. The compilation was eventually released on August 20, 2007, in the United Kingdom to coincide with the release of the group's second compilation album, Crazy Sexy Hits: The Very Best of TLC.

Track listing

Special features
 Behind-the-scenes footage
 Photo gallery
 Dolby Digital 5.1 Sound

Charts

Release history

References

2003 greatest hits albums
2003 video albums
Albums produced by Dallas Austin
Albums produced by Jermaine Dupri
Albums produced by Lil Jon
Albums produced by the Neptunes
Albums produced by Organized Noize
Albums produced by Rodney Jerkins
Albums produced by Tim & Bob
Arista Records compilation albums
Arista Records video albums
Music video compilation albums
TLC (group) compilation albums